State Route 68 (SR 68) is a primary state highway in the U.S. state of Virginia.  Known for most of its length as Exeter Road, the state highway runs  from the Lee–Wise county line near Keokee, where the highway continues west as SR 606, east to U.S. Route 23 Business (US 23 Business) in Appalachia.

Route description

SR 68 begins at the Lee County line, which is formed by the drainage divide between Craborchard Creek to the west and Pigeon Creek to the east.  The roadway continues west into Lee County as SR 606 through Keokee toward Pennington Gap.  SR 68, which is named Exeter Road, descends into the valley of Pigeon Creek and passes through the communities of Exeter, Lower Exeter, and Imboden.  East of Lower Exeter, the state highway parallels a rail line that serves the coal mines in the valley.  At Pigeon Creek's confluence with Looney Creek, where the streams enter the Powell River, SR 68 curves north across the rail line, crosses the rail line that parallels Looney Creek, and meets the eastern end of SR 160 (Inman Road).  The state highway continues into the town of Appalachia as Inman Street, which crosses over Norfolk Southern Railway's Appalachia Division before reaching its eastern terminus at US 23 Business (Main Street).

History
The whole length of SR 68, west from State Route 11 (now US 23 Business) near Appalachia to the county line, was added to the state highway system in 1928 as State Route 119. It was renumbered as SR 68 in 1933.

Major intersections

References

External links

Virginia Highways Project: VA 68

068
State Route 068